Neeraj Bora (born 31 March 1967) is an Indian politician and a member of the Uttar Pradesh Legislative Assembly. He is the son of the former U.P. legislator D.P. Bora. He is a member of the Bharatiya Janata Party and was elected into the legislative assembly in the 2022 U.P. elections from the Lucknow North constituency by defeating [Pooja Shukla] of Samajwadi Party.

Life
Neeraj was born in the Shohratgarh tehsil of Siddharthnagar district of Uttar Pradesh. He was always greatly influenced by his father D. P. Bora, a politician, and wanted to work in the social sector from a very early age. After completing his schooling from Mahanagar Boys' School of Lucknow, he went on to study medicine at Dr. B.R. Ambedkar Medical College, Bangalore. He completed MBA programme and became a communication specialist, started teaching.  Neeraj is married to Bindu Bora and has three children, a son and two daughters. In the past, he was also elected as the Dist. Governor & Multiple Council Chairman of Lions Clubs International for MD 321, and was the president of the Lucknow branch of Indian Medical Association in 2002–2005. He is also the president of the International Vaish Federation of U.P.

He also established Sewa Hospital and Bora group of Institutions, including Institute of Allied Health Sciences, Lucknow. A doctor, teacher, philanthropist and politician, he is rendering his services to the society from past three decades, now MLA at Lucknow.
He contested Mayor election for Lucknow Municipal Corporation against Dinesh Sharma BJP as INC candidate and was defeated by nearly 171000 votes in 2012.

References

External links
News18
Times of India
News18
Times of India

1967 births
Living people
Uttar Pradesh MLAs 2017–2022
Indian National Congress politicians from Uttar Pradesh
Bharatiya Janata Party politicians from Uttar Pradesh
Bahujan Samaj Party politicians from Uttar Pradesh
Politicians from Lucknow
Uttar Pradesh MLAs 2022–2027